The Wailuā River is a major river on the island of Kauai in the U.S. state of Hawaii.  long, it is one of the largest river, as well as Kauai's 5th longest river. It is the only navigable river (by boats larger than kayaks) in the Hawaiian Islands. It is a center of activity for locals and visitors in the form of boat tours to Fern Grotto, kayaking and water skiing.

Other points of interest along the river system include a bird refuge, Kamokila Hawaiian Village, Secret Falls and a pool which formerly included a rope swing.

See also
Wailua, Hawaii
Wailua River State Park
List of rivers of Hawaii

References

Rivers of Kauai